Eupanacra automedon is a moth of the  family Sphingidae.

Distribution 
It is known from north-eastern India, Nepal, Myanmar, Thailand, Peninsular Malaysia, Sumatra, Nias, Java and Borneo.

Description 
It is very similar to Eupanacra malayana but distinguishable by the forewing outer margin having a single sharp point at the apex and no darker brown longitudinal shadow. The forewing upperside has postmedian lines closer together and more longitudinal than in Eupanacra malayana, almost parallel to the costa.

Biology 
The larvae have been recorded on Lasia spinosa. The ground colour of the body is jade-green without distinct markings. It has a pale beige horn. The body ground colour of the last instar is uniform brown with an unmistakable pair of anterior ocelli located at its
first abdominal segment and a tail horn that is shorter and back-curved

References

Eupanacra
Moths described in 1856